Sandy Valley is an unincorporated community in Jefferson County, in the U.S. state of Pennsylvania.

History
A post office called Sandy Valley was established in 1872, and remained in operation until 1930. The community had a depot on the Low Grade Railroad.

References

Unincorporated communities in Jefferson County, Pennsylvania
Unincorporated communities in Pennsylvania